Jay Funeral Home, now known as the Robertson-Jay Funeral Home, is an historic building and funeral home located in Ottumwa, Iowa, United States. Local architect Archie Eaton designed the building in the Mediterranean Revival style. The two-story brick structure was completed in 1929. The exterior of the building features round arch windows, a tile roof, and a broad brick porte cochere. The building is noteworthy for its architecture and as an early example of funeral home design. It was individually listed on the National Register of Historic Places in 1995. In 1998 it was included as a contributing property in the Fifth Street Bluff Historic District.

References

Commercial buildings completed in 1929
Mediterranean Revival architecture in Iowa
Buildings and structures in Ottumwa, Iowa
Commercial buildings on the National Register of Historic Places in Iowa
Death care companies of the United States
National Register of Historic Places in Wapello County, Iowa
Individually listed contributing properties to historic districts on the National Register in Iowa